Skollenborg Station is a railway station located at the village of Skollenborg in Kongsberg, Norway. The station is on the Sørlandet Line railway. Skollenborg Station was served by local trains between Kongsberg via Oslo to Eidsvoll until December 2012.

History

The station was opened in 1871 as a branch line of Randsfjorden Line was opened between Hokksund and Kongsberg. The Skollenborg Station  building was  designed by architect Georg Andreas Bull. Skollenborg  transformer substation  was designed by Gudmund Hoel  and was built in 1926.

References

Railway stations in Buskerud
Railway stations on the Sørlandet Line
Railway stations opened in 1871
1871 establishments in Norway
Kongsberg